Diego Rueda Rico (11 October 1575 – 8 December 1639) was a Roman Catholic prelate who served as Bishop of Tui (1639).

Biography
Diego Rueda Rico was born in Granada, Spain on 11 October 1575. On 7 February 1639, he was appointed during the papacy of Pope Urban VIII as Bishop of Tui. In 1639, he was consecrated bishop by Domingo Pimentel Zúñiga, Bishop of Córdoba, with Miguel Avellán, Titular Bishop of Siriensis, and Juan Alonso y Ocón, Bishop of Yucatán, serving as co-consecrators. He served as Bishop of Tui until his death on 8 December 1639.

References

External links and additional sources
 (for Chronology of Bishops) 
 (for Chronology of Bishops) 

17th-century Roman Catholic bishops in Spain
Bishops appointed by Pope Urban VIII
1575 births
1639 deaths